Hystrichonyssus turneri is a species of mite placed in its own family, Hystrichonyssidae, in the order Mesostigmata.

References

Mesostigmata